Saskatoon Nutana is a provincial electoral district for the Legislative Assembly of Saskatchewan, Canada. It is named for the neighbourhood of Nutana which is one of several within its electoral boundaries.

Members of the Legislative Assembly

This riding has elected the following Members of the Legislative Assembly of Saskatchewan:

Election results

References

External links 
Website of the Legislative Assembly of Saskatchewan
Map of Saskatoon Nutana riding as of 2016

Saskatchewan provincial electoral districts
Politics of Saskatoon